Karl Pawlik (12 March 1849, Klattau – 7 September 1914, Prague) was an Austro-Hungarian obstetrician and gynecologist.

He studied medicine at the University of Vienna, and surgery at Vienna General Hospital as a pupil of Theodor Billroth. He obtained his medical doctorate in 1873, and from 1877 served as assistant to Karl von Braun-Fernwald at the university women's hospital. In 1881 he received his habilitation, and several years later was named head of the department of obstetrics at the Vienna General Polyclinic. From 1887 to 1913 he was a professor at the University of Prague.

In August 1889 he performed the first successful cystectomy on a patient suffering from papillomatosis of the bladder. He is also credited for introducing operations for cancer of the cervix uteri and for urinary incontinence. In addition, he introduced a method for freehand catheterization of the ureters and was a pioneer of direct-vision air cystoscopy. The eponymous "Pawlik's folds" are defined as anterior columns of the vagina forming the lateral boundaries of "Pawlik's triangle" (vaginal trigone of Pawlik).

Published works 
 Zwei Fälle von Sectio caesarea mit Exstirpation des Uterus, 1879 – Two cases of caesarean section with extirpation of the uterus.
 Über das Sondieren der Ureteren der weiblichen Blase aus freier Hand ohne vorbereitende Operation, 1881.
 Über die Operation der Blasenscheidenfisteln, 1882 – On an operation for vesicovaginal fistula.
 Zur Frage der Behandlung der Uteruscarcinome, 1882 – On treatment for uterine cancer.
 Exstirpation des Uterus und des Beckenzellgewebes, 1889 – Extirpation of the uterus and pelvic subcutaneous tissue.
 Über Blasenexstirpation, 1891 – On bladder extirpation.

References 

1849 births
1914 deaths
People from Klatovy
University of Vienna alumni
Academic staff of Charles University
Austro-Hungarian physicians